This is a list of the bird species recorded in Libya. The avifauna of Libya include a total of 360 species. Two species listed are extirpated in Libya.

This list's taxonomic treatment (designation and sequence of orders, families and species) and nomenclature (common and scientific names) follow the conventions of The Clements Checklist of Birds of the World, 2022 edition. The family accounts at the beginning of each heading reflect this taxonomy, as do the species counts found in each family account. Accidental species are included in the total species count for Libya.

The following tags have been used to highlight several categories. The commonly occurring native species do not fall into any of these categories.

(A) Accidental - a species that rarely or accidentally occurs in Libya
(Ex) Extirpated - a species that no longer occurs in Libya although populations exist elsewhere
(I) Introduced - a species introduced to Libya as a consequence, direct or indirect, of human actions

Ostriches
Order: StruthioniformesFamily: Struthionidae

The ostrich is a flightless bird native to Africa. It is the largest living species of bird. It is distinctive in its appearance, with a long neck and legs and the ability to run at high speeds.

Common ostrich, Struthio camelus (Ex)

Ducks, geese, and waterfowl
Order: AnseriformesFamily: Anatidae

Anatidae includes the ducks and most duck-like waterfowl, such as geese and swans. These birds are adapted to an aquatic existence with webbed feet, flattened bills, and feathers that are excellent at shedding water due to an oily coating.

Graylag goose, Anser anser (A)
Greater white-fronted goose, Anser albifrons (A)
Brant, Branta bernicla'
Mute swan, Cygnus olorTundra swan, Cygnus columbianus (A)'
Ruddy shelduck, Tadorna ferruginea (A)
Common shelduck, Tadorna tadornaGarganey, Spatula querquedulaBlue-winged teal, Spatula discors (A)
Northern shoveler, Spatula clypeataGadwall, Mareca streperaEurasian wigeon, Mareca penelopeMallard, Anas platyrhynchosNorthern pintail, Anas acutaGreen-winged teal, Anas creccaMarbled teal, Marmaronetta angustirostrisRed-crested pochard, Netta rufinaCommon pochard, Aythya ferinaFerruginous duck, Aythya nyrocaTufted duck, Aythya fuligulaGreater scaup, Aythya marilaCommon scoter, Melanitta nigra (A)
Common goldeneye, Bucephala clangula (A)
Smew, Mergellus albellus (A)
Common merganser, Mergus merganserRed-breasted merganser, Mergus serratorWhite-headed duck, Oxyura leucocephala (A)

Pheasants, grouse, and allies
Order: GalliformesFamily: Phasianidae

The Phasianidae are a family of terrestrial birds which consists of quails, partridges, snowcocks, francolins, spurfowls, tragopans, monals, pheasants, peafowls and jungle fowls. In general, they are plump (although they vary in size) and have broad, relatively short wings.

Common quail, Coturnix coturnixBarbary partridge, Alectoris barbaraFlamingos
Order: PhoenicopteriformesFamily: Phoenicopteridae

Flamingos filter-feed on shellfish and algae. Their oddly shaped beaks are specially adapted to separate mud and silt from the food they consume and, uniquely, are used upside-down.

Greater flamingo, Phoenicopterus roseusGrebes
Order: PodicipediformesFamily: Podicipedidae

Grebes are small to medium-large freshwater diving birds. They have lobed toes and are excellent swimmers and divers. However, they have their feet placed far back on the body, making them quite ungainly on land.

Little grebe, Tachybaptus ruficollisHorned grebe, Podiceps auritus (A)
Great crested grebe, Podiceps cristatusEared grebe, Podiceps nigricollisPigeons and doves
Order: ColumbiformesFamily: Columbidae

Pigeons and doves are stout-bodied birds with short necks and short slender bills with a fleshy cere.

Rock pigeon, Columba liviaStock dove, Columba oenas (A)
Common wood-pigeon, Columba palumbus (A)
European turtle-dove, Streptopelia turturOriental turtle-dove, Streptopelia orientalis (A)
Eurasian collared-dove, Streptopelia decaocto (I)
Laughing dove, Streptopelia senegalensisSandgrouse
Order: PterocliformesFamily: Pteroclidae

Sandgrouse have small, pigeon like heads and necks, but sturdy compact bodies. They have long pointed wings and sometimes tails and a fast direct flight. Flocks fly to watering holes at dawn and dusk. Their legs are feathered down to the toes.

Pin-tailed sandgrouse, Pterocles alchataSpotted sandgrouse, Pterocles senegallusBlack-bellied sandgrouse, Pterocles orientalisCrowned sandgrouse, Pterocles coronatusBustards
Order: OtidiformesFamily: Otididae

Bustards are large terrestrial birds mainly associated with dry open country and steppes in the Old World. They are omnivorous and nest on the ground. They walk steadily on strong legs and big toes, pecking for food as they go. They have long broad wings with "fingered" wingtips and striking patterns in flight. Many have interesting mating displays.

Houbara bustard, Chlamydotis undulataLittle bustard, Tetrax tetraxCuckoos
Order: CuculiformesFamily: Cuculidae

The family Cuculidae includes cuckoos, roadrunners and anis. These birds are of variable size with slender bodies, long tails and strong legs. The Old World cuckoos are brood parasites.

Great spotted cuckoo, Clamator glandarius (A)
Common cuckoo, Cuculus canorusNightjars and allies
Order: CaprimulgiformesFamily: Caprimulgidae

Nightjars are medium-sized nocturnal birds that usually nest on the ground. They have long wings, short legs and very short bills. Most have small feet, of little use for walking, and long pointed wings. Their soft plumage is camouflaged to resemble bark or leaves.

Red-necked nightjar, Caprimulgus ruficollis (A)
Eurasian nightjar, Caprimulgus europaeusEgyptian nightjar, Caprimulgus aegyptiusSwifts
Order: CaprimulgiformesFamily: Apodidae

Swifts are small birds which spend the majority of their lives flying. These birds have very short legs and never settle voluntarily on the ground, perching instead only on vertical surfaces. Many swifts have long swept-back wings which resemble a crescent or boomerang.

Alpine swift, Apus melbaCommon swift, Apus apusPallid swift, Apus pallidusLittle swift, Apus affinisRails, gallinules, and coots
Order: GruiformesFamily: Rallidae

Rallidae is a large family of small to medium-sized birds which includes the rails, crakes, coots and gallinules. Typically they inhabit dense vegetation in damp environments near lakes, swamps or rivers. In general they are shy and secretive birds, making them difficult to observe. Most species have strong legs and long toes which are well adapted to soft uneven surfaces. They tend to have short, rounded wings and to be weak fliers.

Water rail, Rallus aquaticusCorn crake, Crex crex (A)
Spotted crake, Porzana porzanaEurasian moorhen, Gallinula chloropusEurasian coot, Fulica atraStriped crake, Amaurornis marginalis (A)
Little crake, Zapornia parvaBaillon's crake, Zapornia pusilla (A)

Cranes
Order: GruiformesFamily: Gruidae

Cranes are large, long-legged and long-necked birds. Unlike the similar-looking but unrelated herons, cranes fly with necks outstretched, not pulled back. Most have elaborate and noisy courting displays or "dances".

Common crane, Grus grusThick-knees
Order: CharadriiformesFamily: Burhinidae

The thick-knees are a group of largely tropical waders in the family Burhinidae. They are found worldwide within the tropical zone, with some species also breeding in temperate Europe and Australia. They are medium to large waders with strong black or yellow-black bills, large yellow eyes and cryptic plumage. Despite being classed as waders, most species have a preference for arid or semi-arid habitats.

Eurasian thick-knee, Burhinus oedicnemusEgyptian plover
Order: CharadriiformesFamily: Pluvianidae

The Egyptian plover is found across equatorial Africa and along the Nile River.

Egyptian plover, Pluvianus aegyptius (A)

Stilts and avocets
Order: CharadriiformesFamily: Recurvirostridae

Recurvirostridae is a family of large wading birds, which includes the avocets and stilts. The avocets have long legs and long up-curved bills. The stilts have extremely long legs and long, thin, straight bills.

Black-winged stilt, Himantopus himantopusPied avocet, Recurvirostra avosettaOystercatchers
Order: CharadriiformesFamily: Haematopodidae

The oystercatchers are large and noisy plover-like birds, with strong bills used for smashing or prising open molluscs.

Eurasian oystercatcher, Haematopus ostralegusPlovers and lapwings
Order: CharadriiformesFamily: Charadriidae

The family Charadriidae includes the plovers, dotterels and lapwings. They are small to medium-sized birds with compact bodies, short, thick necks and long, usually pointed, wings. They are found in open country worldwide, mostly in habitats near water.

Black-bellied plover, Pluvialis squatarolaEuropean golden-plover, Pluvialis apricariaNorthern lapwing, Vanellus vanellusSpur-winged lapwing, Vanellus spinosus (A)
White-tailed lapwing, Vanellus leucurus (A)
Lesser sand-plover, Charadrius mongolus (A)
Greater sand-plover, Charadrius leschenaultiiCaspian plover, Charadrius asiaticus (A)
Kentish plover, Charadrius alexandrinusCommon ringed plover, Charadrius hiaticulaLittle ringed plover, Charadrius dubiusEurasian dotterel, Charadrius morinellusSandpipers and allies
Order: CharadriiformesFamily: Scolopacidae

Scolopacidae is a large diverse family of small to medium-sized shorebirds including the sandpipers, curlews, godwits, shanks, tattlers, woodcocks, snipes, dowitchers and phalaropes. The majority of these species eat small invertebrates picked out of the mud or soil. Variation in length of legs and bills enables multiple species to feed in the same habitat, particularly on the coast, without direct competition for food.

Whimbrel, Numenius phaeopusSlender-billed curlew, Numenius tenuirostris (A)
Eurasian curlew, Numenius arquataBar-tailed godwit, Limosa lapponica (A)
Black-tailed godwit, Limosa limosaRuddy turnstone, Arenaria interpresRed knot, Calidris canutus (A)
Ruff, Calidris pugnaxBroad-billed sandpiper, Calidris falcinellusCurlew sandpiper, Calidris ferrugineaTemminck's stint, Calidris temminckiiSanderling, Calidris albaDunlin, Calidris alpinaPurple sandpiper, Calidris maritimaLittle stint, Calidris minutaPectoral sandpiper, Calidris melanotosJack snipe, Lymnocryptes minimusEurasian woodcock, Scolopax rusticolaGreat snipe, Gallinago mediaCommon snipe, Gallinago gallinagoTerek sandpiper, Xenus cinereus (A)
Red-necked phalarope, Phalaropus lobatusRed phalarope, Phalaropus fulicariusCommon sandpiper, Actitis hypoleucosGreen sandpiper, Tringa ochropusSpotted redshank, Tringa erythropusCommon greenshank, Tringa nebulariaMarsh sandpiper, Tringa stagnatilisWood sandpiper, Tringa glareolaCommon redshank, Tringa totanusPratincoles and coursers
Order: CharadriiformesFamily: Glareolidae

Glareolidae is a family of wading birds comprising the pratincoles, which have short legs, long pointed wings and long forked tails, and the coursers, which have long legs, short wings and long, pointed bills which curve downwards.

Cream-colored courser, Cursorius cursorCollared pratincole, Glareola pratincolaBlack-winged pratincole, Glareola nordmanniSkuas and jaegers
Order: CharadriiformesFamily: Stercorariidae

The family Stercorariidae are, in general, medium to large birds, typically with grey or brown plumage, often with white markings on the wings. They nest on the ground in temperate and arctic regions and are long-distance migrants.

Great skua, Stercorarius skua (A)
Pomarine jaeger, Stercorarius pomarinus (A)
Parasitic jaeger, Stercorarius parasiticus (A)

Gulls, terns, and skimmers
Order: CharadriiformesFamily: Laridae

Laridae is a family of medium to large seabirds, the gulls, terns, and skimmers. Gulls are typically grey or white, often with black markings on the head or wings. They have stout, longish bills and webbed feet. Terns are a group of generally medium to large seabirds typically with grey or white plumage, often with black markings on the head. Most terns hunt fish by diving but some pick insects off the surface of fresh water. Terns are generally long-lived birds, with several species known to live in excess of 30 years.

Slender-billed gull, Chroicocephalus geneiBlack-headed gull, Chroicocephalus ridibundusLittle gull, Hydrocoloeus minutusFranklin's gull, Leucophaeus pipixcan (A)
Mediterranean gull, Ichthyaetus melanocephalusPallas's gull, Ichthyaetus ichthyaetusAudouin's gull, Ichthyaetus audouiniiCommon gull, Larus canusYellow-legged gull, Larus michahellisCaspian gull, Larus cachinnans 
Armenian gull, Larus armenicus (A)
Lesser black-backed gull, Larus fuscusGreat black-backed gull, Larus marinus (A)
Little tern, Sternula albifronsGull-billed tern, Gelochelidon niloticaCaspian tern, Hydroprogne caspiaBlack tern, Chlidonias nigerWhite-winged tern, Chlidonias leucopterusWhiskered tern, Chlidonias hybridusRoseate tern, Sterna dougalliiCommon tern, Sterna hirundoArctic tern, Sterna paradisaeaSandwich tern, Thalasseus sandvicensisLesser crested tern, Thalasseus bengalensisNorthern storm-petrels
Order: ProcellariiformesFamily: Hydrobatidae

The northern-storm petrels are relatives of the petrels and are the smallest seabirds. They feed on planktonic crustaceans and small fish picked from the surface, typically while hovering. The flight is fluttering and sometimes bat-like.

European storm-petrel, Hydrobates pelagicusShearwaters and petrels
Order: ProcellariiformesFamily: Procellariidae

The procellariids are the main group of medium-sized "true petrels", characterised by united nostrils with medium septum and a long outer functional primary.

Cory's shearwater, Calonectris diomedeaYelkouan shearwater, Puffinus yelkouanBalearic shearwater, Puffinus mauretanicusStorks
Order: CiconiiformesFamily: Ciconiidae

Storks are large, long-legged, long-necked, wading birds with long, stout bills. Storks are mute, but bill-clattering is an important mode of communication at the nest. Their nests can be large and may be reused for many years. Many species are migratory.

Black stork, Ciconia nigra (A)
White stork, Ciconia ciconiaBoobies and gannets
Order: SuliformesFamily: Sulidae

The sulids comprise the gannets and boobies. Both groups are medium to large coastal seabirds that plunge-dive for fish.

Northern gannet, Morus bassanusCormorants and shags
Order: SuliformesFamily: Phalacrocoracidae

Phalacrocoracidae is a family of medium to large coastal, fish-eating seabirds that includes cormorants and shags. Plumage colouration varies, with the majority having mainly dark plumage, some species being black-and-white and a few being colourful.

Great cormorant, Phalacrocorax carboEuropean shag, Gulosus aristotelis (A)

Pelicans
Order: PelecaniformesFamily: Pelecanidae

Pelicans are large water birds with a distinctive pouch under their beak. As with other members of the order Pelecaniformes, they have webbed feet with four toes.

Great white pelican, Pelecanus onocrotalus (A)

Herons, egrets, and bitterns
Order: PelecaniformesFamily: Ardeidae

The family Ardeidae contains the bitterns, herons and egrets. Herons and egrets are medium to large wading birds with long necks and legs. Bitterns tend to be shorter necked and more wary. Members of Ardeidae fly with their necks retracted, unlike other long-necked birds such as storks, ibises and spoonbills.

Great bittern, Botaurus stellarisLittle bittern, Ixobrychus minutusGray heron, Ardea cinereaPurple heron, Ardea purpureaGreat egret, Ardea albaLittle egret, Egretta garzettaCattle egret, Bubulcus ibisSquacco heron, Ardeola ralloidesBlack-crowned night-heron, Nycticorax nycticoraxIbises and spoonbills
Order: PelecaniformesFamily: Threskiornithidae

Threskiornithidae is a family of large terrestrial and wading birds which includes the ibises and spoonbills. They have long, broad wings with 11 primary and about 20 secondary feathers. They are strong fliers and despite their size and weight, very capable soarers.

Glossy ibis, Plegadis falcinellusEurasian spoonbill, Platalea leucorodiaOsprey
Order: AccipitriformesFamily: Pandionidae

The family Pandionidae contains only one species, the osprey. The osprey is a medium-large raptor which is a specialist fish-eater with a worldwide distribution.

Osprey, Pandion haliaetusHawks, eagles, and kites 
Order: AccipitriformesFamily: Accipitridae

Accipitridae is a family of birds of prey, which includes hawks, eagles, kites, harriers and Old World vultures. These birds have powerful hooked beaks for tearing flesh from their prey, strong legs, powerful talons and keen eyesight.

Black-winged kite, Elanus caeruleus (A)
Egyptian vulture, Neophron percnopterusEuropean honey-buzzard, Pernis apivorusCinereous vulture, Aegypius monachusLappet-faced vulture, Torgos tracheliotos (A)
Eurasian griffon, Gyps fulvus (A)
Short-toed snake-eagle, Circaetus gallicusLesser spotted eagle, Clanga pomarinaGreater spotted eagle, Clanga clanga (A)
Booted eagle, Hieraaetus pennatusImperial eagle, Aquila heliaca (A)
Golden eagle, Aquila chrysaetosBonelli's eagle, Aquila fasciataEurasian marsh-harrier, Circus aeruginosusHen harrier, Circus cyaneusPallid harrier, Circus macrourusMontagu's harrier, Circus pygargusEurasian sparrowhawk, Accipiter nisusNorthern goshawk, Accipiter gentilis (A)
Red kite, Milvus milvus (A)
Black kite, Milvus migransRough-legged hawk, Buteo lagopus (A)
Common buzzard, Buteo buteoLong-legged buzzard, Buteo rufinusBarn-owls
Order: StrigiformesFamily: Tytonidae

Barn-owls are medium to large owls with large heads and characteristic heart-shaped faces. They have long strong legs with powerful talons.

Barn owl, Tyto albaOwls
Order: StrigiformesFamily: Strigidae

The typical owls are small to large solitary nocturnal birds of prey. They have large forward-facing eyes and ears, a hawk-like beak and a conspicuous circle of feathers around each eye called a facial disk.

Eurasian scops-owl, Otus scopsPharaoh eagle-owl, Bubo ascalaphusLittle owl, Athene noctuaLong-eared owl, Asio otusShort-eared owl, Asio flammeusHoopoes
Order: BucerotiformesFamily: Upupidae

Hoopoes have black, white and orangey-pink colouring with a large erectile crest on their head.

Eurasian hoopoe, Upupa epopsKingfishers
Order: CoraciiformesFamily: Alcedinidae

Kingfishers are medium-sized birds with large heads, long, pointed bills, short legs and stubby tails.

Common kingfisher, Alcedo atthisPied kingfisher, Ceryle rudis (A)

Bee-eaters
Order: CoraciiformesFamily: Meropidae

The bee-eaters are a group of near passerine birds in the family Meropidae. Most species are found in Africa but others occur in southern Europe, Madagascar, Australia and New Guinea. They are characterised by richly coloured plumage, slender bodies and usually elongated central tail feathers. All are colourful and have long downturned bills and pointed wings, which give them a swallow-like appearance when seen from afar.

African green bee-eater, Merops viridissimusBlue-cheeked bee-eater, Merops persicusEuropean bee-eater, Merops apiasterRollers
Order: CoraciiformesFamily: Coraciidae

Rollers resemble crows in size and build, but are more closely related to the kingfishers and bee-eaters. They share the colourful appearance of those groups with blues and browns predominating. The two inner front toes are connected, but the outer toe is not.

European roller, Coracias garrulusAbyssinian roller, Coracias abyssinica (A)

Woodpeckers
Order: PiciformesFamily: Picidae

Woodpeckers are small to medium-sized birds with chisel-like beaks, short legs, stiff tails and long tongues used for capturing insects. Some species have feet with two toes pointing forward and two backward, while several species have only three toes. Many woodpeckers have the habit of tapping noisily on tree trunks with their beaks.

Eurasian wryneck, Jynx torquillaFalcons and caracaras
Order: FalconiformesFamily: Falconidae

Falconidae is a family of diurnal birds of prey. They differ from hawks, eagles and kites in that they kill with their beaks instead of their talons.

Lesser kestrel, Falco naumanniEurasian kestrel, Falco tinnunculusRed-footed falcon, Falco vespertinusEleonora's falcon, Falco eleonoraeSooty falcon, Falco concolorMerlin, Falco columbariusEurasian hobby, Falco subbuteo (Ex)
Lanner falcon, Falco biarmicusSaker falcon, Falco cherrugPeregrine falcon, Falco peregrinusOld World parrots
Order: PsittaciformesFamily: Psittaculidae

Characteristic features of parrots include a strong curved bill, an upright stance, strong legs, and clawed zygodactyl feet. Many parrots are vividly colored, and some are multi-colored. Old World parrots are found from Africa east across south and southeast Asia and Oceania to Australia and New Zealand.

Rose-ringed parakeet, Psittacula krameriOld World orioles
Order: PasseriformesFamily: Oriolidae

The Old World orioles are colourful passerine birds. They are not related to the New World orioles.

Eurasian golden oriole, Oriolus oriolusBushshrikes and allies
Order: PasseriformesFamily: Malaconotidae

Bushshrikes are similar in habits to shrikes, hunting insects and other small prey from a perch on a bush. Although similar in build to the shrikes, these tend to be either colourful species or largely black; some species are quite secretive.

Black-crowned tchagra, Tchagra senegalaShrikes
Order: PasseriformesFamily: Laniidae

Shrikes are passerine birds known for their habit of catching other birds and small animals and impaling the uneaten portions of their bodies on thorns. A typical shrike's beak is hooked, like a bird of prey.

Red-backed shrike, Lanius collurioRed-tailed shrike, Lanius phoenicuroidesIsabelline shrike, Lanius isabellinusGreat gray shrike, Lanius excubitorLesser gray shrike, Lanius minorMasked shrike, Lanius nubicus (A)
Woodchat shrike, Lanius senatorCrows, jays, and magpies
Order: PasseriformesFamily: Corvidae

The family Corvidae includes crows, ravens, jays, choughs, magpies, treepies, nutcrackers and ground jays. Corvids are above average in size among the Passeriformes, and some of the larger species show high levels of intelligence.

Carrion crow, Corvus corone (A)
Hooded crow, Corvus cornix (A)
Pied crow, Corvus albus (A)
Brown-necked raven, Corvus ruficollisFan-tailed raven, Corvus rhipidurus (A)
Common raven, Corvus coraxTits, chickadees, and titmice
Order: PasseriformesFamily: Paridae

The Paridae are mainly small stocky woodland species with short stout bills. Some have crests. They are adaptable birds, with a mixed diet including seeds and insects.

African blue tit, Cyanistes teneriffaeLarks
Order: PasseriformesFamily: Alaudidae

Larks are small terrestrial birds with often extravagant songs and display flights. Most larks are fairly dull in appearance. Their food is insects and seeds.

Greater hoopoe-lark, Alaemon alaudipesThick-billed lark, Ramphocoris clotbeyBar-tailed lark, Ammomanes cincturusDesert lark, Ammomanes desertiTemminck's lark, Eremophila bilophaGreater short-toed lark, Calandrella brachydactylaCalandra lark, Melanocorypha calandraDupont's lark, Chersophilus dupontiMediterranean short-toed lark, Alaudala rufescensWood lark, Lullula arboreaEurasian skylark, Alauda arvensisThekla lark, Galerida theklaeCrested lark, Galerida cristataCisticolas and allies
Order: PasseriformesFamily: Cisticolidae

The Cisticolidae are warblers found mainly in warmer southern regions of the Old World. They are generally very small birds of drab brown or grey appearance found in open country such as grassland or scrub.

Zitting cisticola, Cisticola juncidisReed warblers and allies
Order: PasseriformesFamily: Acrocephalidae

The members of this family are usually rather large for "warblers". Most are rather plain olivaceous brown above with much yellow to beige below. They are usually found in open woodland, reedbeds, or tall grass. The family occurs mostly in southern to western Eurasia and surroundings, but it also ranges far into the Pacific, with some species in Africa.

Eastern olivaceous warbler, Iduna pallidaWestern olivaceous warbler, Iduna opacaMelodious warbler, Hippolais polyglotta (A)
Icterine warbler, Hippolais icterinaAquatic warbler, Acrocephalus paludicola (A)
Moustached warbler, Acrocephalus melanopogon (A)
Sedge warbler, Acrocephalus schoenobaenusCommon reed warbler, Acrocephalus scirpaceusGreat reed warbler, Acrocephalus arundinaceusGrassbirds and allies
Order: PasseriformesFamily: Locustellidae

Locustellidae are a family of small insectivorous songbirds found mainly in Eurasia, Africa, and the Australian region. They are smallish birds with tails that are usually long and pointed, and tend to be drab brownish or buffy all over.

Savi's warbler, Locustella luscinioidesCommon grasshopper-warbler, Locustella naeviaSwallows
Order: PasseriformesFamily: Hirundinidae

The family Hirundinidae is adapted to aerial feeding. They have a slender streamlined body, long pointed wings and a short bill with a wide gape. The feet are adapted to perching rather than walking, and the front toes are partially joined at the base.

Bank swallow, Riparia ripariaEurasian crag-martin, Ptyonoprogne rupestrisRock martin, Ptyonoprogne fuligulaBarn swallow, Hirundo rusticaRed-rumped swallow, Cecropis dauricaCommon house-martin, Delichon urbicumLeaf warblers
Order: PasseriformesFamily: Phylloscopidae

Leaf warblers are a family of small insectivorous birds found mostly in Eurasia and ranging into Wallacea and Africa. The species are of various sizes, often green-plumaged above and yellow below, or more subdued with grayish-green to grayish-brown colors.

Wood warbler, Phylloscopus sibilatrixWestern Bonelli's warbler, Phylloscopus bonelliEastern Bonelli's warbler, Phylloscopus orientalis (A)
Yellow-browed warbler, Phylloscopus inornatus (A)
Willow warbler, Phylloscopus trochilusCommon chiffchaff, Phylloscopus collybitaArctic warbler, Phylloscopus borealis (A)

Bush warblers and allies
Order: PasseriformesFamily: Scotocercidae

The members of this family are found throughout Africa, Asia, and Polynesia. Their taxonomy is in flux, and some authorities place some genera in other families.

Scrub warbler, Scotocerca inquietaSylviid warblers, parrotbills, and allies
Order: PasseriformesFamily: Sylviidae

The family Sylviidae is a group of small insectivorous passerine birds. They mainly occur as breeding species, as the common name implies, in Europe, Asia and, to a lesser extent, Africa. Most are of generally undistinguished appearance, but many have distinctive songs.

Eurasian blackcap, Sylvia atricapillaGarden warbler, Sylvia borinBarred warbler, Curruca nisoria (A)
Lesser whitethroat, Curruca currucaWestern Orphean warbler, Curruca hortensisEastern Orphean warbler, Curruca crassirostrisAfrican desert warbler, Curruca desertiTristram's warbler, Curruca deserticolaRüppell's warbler, Curruca ruppelliSardinian warbler, Curruca melanocephala
Moltoni's warbler, Curruca subalpina (A)
Western subalpine warbler, Curruca iberiae (A)
Greater whitethroat, Curruca communis
Spectacled warbler, Curruca conspicillata
Marmora's warbler, Curruca sarda
Dartford warbler, Curruca undata (A)

LaughingthrushesOrder: PasseriformesFamily: Leiothrichidae

The laughingthrushes are somewhat diverse in size and colouration, but are characterised by soft fluffy plumage.

Fulvous chatterer, Argya fulva

KingletsOrder: PasseriformesFamily: Regulidae

The kinglets, also called crests, are a small group of birds often included in the Old World warblers, but frequently given family status because they also resemble the titmice.

Goldcrest, Regulus regulus
Common firecrest, Regulus ignicapillus

WrensOrder: PasseriformesFamily: Troglodytidae

The wrens are mainly small and inconspicuous except for their loud songs. These birds have short wings and thin down-turned bills. Several species often hold their tails upright. All are insectivorous.

Eurasian wren, Troglodytes troglodytes

DippersOrder: PasseriformesFamily: Cinclidae

Dippers are a group of perching birds whose habitat includes aquatic environments in the Americas, Europe and Asia. They are named for their bobbing or dipping movements.

White-throated dipper, Cinclus cinclus (A)

StarlingsOrder: PasseriformesFamily: Sturnidae

Starlings are small to medium-sized passerine birds. Their flight is strong and direct and they are very gregarious. Their preferred habitat is fairly open country. They eat insects and fruit. Plumage is typically dark with a metallic sheen.

European starling, Sturnus vulgaris
Spotless starling, Sturnus unicolor (A)
Rosy starling, Pastor roseus (A)

Thrushes and alliesOrder: PasseriformesFamily: Turdidae

The thrushes are a group of passerine birds that occur mainly in the Old World. They are plump, soft plumaged, small to medium-sized insectivores or sometimes omnivores, often feeding on the ground. Many have attractive songs.

Mistle thrush, Turdus viscivorus
Song thrush, Turdus philomelos
Redwing, Turdus iliacus (A)
Eurasian blackbird, Turdus merula
Fieldfare, Turdus pilaris
Ring ouzel, Turdus torquatus

Old World flycatchersOrder: PasseriformesFamily: Muscicapidae

Old World flycatchers are a large group of small passerine birds native to the Old World. They are mainly small arboreal insectivores. The appearance of these birds is highly varied, but they mostly have weak songs and harsh calls.

Spotted flycatcher, Muscicapa striata
Rufous-tailed scrub-robin, Cercotrichas galactotes
European robin, Erithacus rubecula
Thrush nightingale, Luscinia luscinia (A)
Common nightingale, Luscinia megarhynchos
Bluethroat, Luscinia svecica
Red-breasted flycatcher, Ficedula parva
Semicollared flycatcher, Ficedula semitorquata (A)
European pied flycatcher, Ficedula hypoleuca
Collared flycatcher, Ficedula albicollis
Moussier's redstart, Phoenicurus moussieri
Common redstart, Phoenicurus phoenicurus
Black redstart, Phoenicurus ochruros
Rufous-tailed rock-thrush, Monticola saxatilis
Blue rock-thrush, Monticola solitarius
Whinchat, Saxicola rubetra
European stonechat, Saxicola rubicola
Northern wheatear, Oenanthe oenanthe
Isabelline wheatear, Oenanthe isabellina
Desert wheatear, Oenanthe deserti
Western black-eared wheatear, Oenanthe hispanica
Pied wheatear, Oenanthe pleschanka (A)
Red-rumped wheatear, Oenanthe moesta
Black wheatear, Oenanthe leucura
White-crowned wheatear, Oenanthe leucopyga
Finsch's wheatear, Oenanthe finschii (A)
Mourning wheatear, Oenanthe lugens
Kurdish wheatear, Oenanthe xanthoprymna (A)

AccentorsOrder: PasseriformesFamily: Prunellidae

The accentors are in the only bird family, Prunellidae, which is completely endemic to the Palearctic. They are small, fairly drab species superficially similar to sparrows.

Dunnock, Prunella modularis

Old World sparrowsOrder: PasseriformesFamily: Passeridae

Old World sparrows are small passerine birds. In general, sparrows tend to be small, plump, brown or grey birds with short tails and short powerful beaks. Sparrows are seed eaters, but they also consume small insects.

House sparrow, Passer domesticus
Spanish sparrow, Passer hispaniolensis
Desert sparrow, Passer simplex
Rock sparrow, Petronia petronia

Wagtails and pipitsOrder: PasseriformesFamily: Motacillidae

Motacillidae is a family of small passerine birds with medium to long tails. They include the wagtails, longclaws and pipits. They are slender, ground feeding insectivores of open country.

Gray wagtail, Motacilla cinerea
Western yellow wagtail, Motacilla flava
White wagtail, Motacilla alba
Tawny pipit, Anthus campestris
Meadow pipit, Anthus pratensis
Tree pipit, Anthus trivialis
Red-throated pipit, Anthus cervinus
Water pipit, Anthus spinoletta

Finches, euphonias, and alliesOrder: PasseriformesFamily: Fringillidae

Finches are seed-eating passerine birds, that are small to moderately large and have a strong beak, usually conical and in some species very large. All have twelve tail feathers and nine primaries. These birds have a bouncing flight with alternating bouts of flapping and gliding on closed wings, and most sing well.

Common chaffinch, Fringilla coelebs
Brambling, Fringilla montifringilla
Hawfinch, Coccothraustes coccothraustes
Trumpeter finch, Bucanetes githaginea
European greenfinch, Chloris chloris
Eurasian linnet, Linaria cannabina
Red crossbill, Loxia curvirostra
European goldfinch, Carduelis carduelis
European serin, Serinus serinus
Eurasian siskin, Spinus spinus

Old World buntingsOrder: PasseriformesFamily': Emberizidae

The emberizids are a large family of passerine birds. They are seed-eating birds with distinctively shaped bills.  Many emberizid species have distinctive head patterns.

Black-headed bunting, Emberiza melanocephala (A)
Corn bunting, Emberiza calandraRock bunting, Emberiza ciaCirl bunting, Emberiza cirlus (A)
Ortolan bunting, Emberiza hortulanaCretzschmar's bunting, Emberiza caesia (A)
House bunting, Emberiza sahariStriolated bunting, Emberiza striolataReed bunting, Emberiza schoeniclus''

See also
List of birds
Lists of birds by region

References

External links
Birds of Libya - World Institute for Conservation and Environment

Libya
Birds
 
Birds
Libya